Squirtle Squirt (foaled 1998 in Kentucky) is an American Champion Thoroughbred racehorse.

Background
Squirtle Squirt was out of the mare Lost The Code, by multiple Grade I winner Lost Code. His sire was 1991 Hollywood Gold Cup winner Marquetry, who also sired the 1999 Breeders' Cup Sprint winner, Artax. Marquetry was a son of 1982 American Horse of the Year and Belmont Stakes winner Conquistador Cielo.

Consigned to the 1998 Keeneland November sale, Squirtle Squirt was sold to Donna Wormser for $30,000. She put him up for auction again at the March 2000 Barretts Auction of 2-year-olds-in-training, where David Lanzman paid $25,000 for the colt with a bad knee. Lanzman turned him over to trainer Jose Garcia, Jr. for race conditioning.

Racing career
In his two-year-old season, Squirtle Squirt won five of his eight starts, including the Grade III Hollywood Juvenile Championship Stakes in July. In November, he underwent surgery for a persistent knee problem, after which his new owner sent him to trainer Bobby Frankel.

In 2001, Squirtle Squirt raced exclusively in sprint races, winning three of his six starts and finishing a close second in the others. Sent east to the Saratoga Race Course in Saratoga Springs, New York, on August 25 the colt won the Grade I King's Bishop Stakes. He then finished second in the Vosburgh Stakes at Belmont Park, where he remained for that year's Breeders' Cup. Entered in the six furlongs Breeders' Cup Sprint, Squirtle Squirt defeated a strong field that included horses such as Xtra Heat (2nd), Caller One (3rd), and the 7:2 betting favorite, Kona Gold. For Frankel, it marked his first win in a Breeders' Cup race after thirty-eight starters.

For his 2001 performances, Squirtle Squirt was voted the Eclipse Award as the American Champion Sprint Horse.

At age four, Squirtle Squirt won two of four starts, with his best graded stakes result a second-place finish in the G2 Palos Verdes Handicap.

Retirement and stud
Retired to stud, Squirtle Squirt stands at Iburi Stallion Station on the island of Hokkaidō in Japan. Later, Squirtle Squirt were moved to Kyushu. The most success horses is Yoka Yoka, she is a Graded Stakes winner at Kitakyushu Kinen.

References
 Video at YouTube of Squirtle Squirt winning the 2001 Breeders' Cup Sprint
 January 26, 2002 Los Angeles Times article titled Squirtle Squirt Has Turned Out to Be a Bargain
 Bloodhorse profile of Squirtle Squirt
 Squirtle Squirt at the official Breeders' Cup website

1998 racehorse births
Racehorses bred in Kentucky
Racehorses trained in the United States
Eclipse Award winners
Breeders' Cup Sprint winners
Thoroughbred family 9-h